George Brun, aka George Brown, Irish poet, fl. late 18th century.

Brun was a native of Dun na Geige or Brownstown, near Hollymount, in County Mayo. One of his few surviving songs or poems, Mairead Nic Shuibhne, is over one hundred verses long, and concerns a woman he loves due to be married to someone else. In the course of the song, the woman tries to save him from depression by pretending that she never loved him.

References

 "County Mayo in Gaelic Folksong", Brian O'Rourke, pp. 178–79, "Mayo: Aspects of its Heritage", ed. Bernard O'Hara, 1982.

18th-century Irish-language poets
People from County Mayo
Year of death unknown
Year of birth missing